State Route 303 (SR 303) is a  south–north state highway in the southeast part of the U.S. state of Georgia. It travels completely within Glynn County, and is in the Brunswick metropolitan area.

Route description
SR 303 begins at an intersection with US 17/SR 25/SR 520 southwest of Brunswick, which is also the eastern terminus of US 82. The route travels northeast across the South Brunswick and Turtle rivers, then arcs to the east. After that curve, it intersects US 25/US 341/SR 27 in Dock Junction. It then makes a curve to the southeast, meeting an intersection with SR 25 Spur. The highway continues southeast, meeting its northern terminus, a second intersection with US 17/SR 25 in Country Club Estates. The route acts as a bypass for US 17/SR 25 around Brunswick.

History

The original (former) corridor of SR 303 was what is now the corridor of Interstate 95.

Major intersections

See also

References

External links

 

303
Transportation in Glynn County, Georgia
Brunswick, Georgia